Ben Howlett (born 21 October 1988) is a former professional Australian rules footballer who played for the Essendon Football Club in the Australian Football League (AFL).

Howlett was selected by Essendon with pick 30 in the 2010 rookie draft, as a 21-year-old from Peel Thunder in the West Australian Football League. His final season with Peel Thunder saw him claim the club's best and fairest award. He was promoted to Essendon's senior list in the 2010 season.

Howlett, along with 33 other Essendon players, was found guilty of using a banned performance-enhancing substance, thymosin beta-4, as part of Essendon's sports supplements program during the 2012 season. He and his teammates were initially found not guilty in March 2015 by the AFL Anti-Doping Tribunal, but a guilty verdict was returned in January 2016 after an appeal by the World Anti-Doping Agency. He was suspended for one season which, with backdating, ended in November 2016; as a result, he served approximately fourteen months of his suspension and missed the entire 2016 AFL season.

Howlett was delisted at the conclusion of the 2017 AFL season. He returned home to WA and signed with the club he was originally drafted from, Peel Thunder in the WAFL, for the 2018 season. In 2019, Howlett was named captain of the club, taking over from dual premiership captain Gerald Ugle. 

In Round 9 of the 2021 WAFL season Howlett played his 100th game for Peel Thunder against Swan Districts before announcing his retirement from WAFL footy at the end of that season.

Statistics

|- style="background-color: #EAEAEA" 
| 2010 ||  || 40 || 15 || 6 || 2 || 140 || 142 || 282 || 43 || 93 || 0.4 || 0.1 || 9.3 || 9.5 || 18.8 || 2.9 || 6.2
|-
| 2011 ||  || 40 || 23 || 9 || 5 || 248 || 177 || 425 || 59 || 153 || 0.4 || 0.2 || 10.8 || 7.7 || 18.5 || 2.6 || 6.6
|- style="background-color: #EAEAEA" 
| 2012 ||  || 40 || 19 || 6 || 8 || 205 || 169 || 374 || 62 || 121 || 0.3 || 0.4 || 10.8 || 8.9 || 19.7 || 3.3 || 6.4
|-
| 2013 ||  || 40 || 19 || 14 || 5 || 171 || 130 || 301 || 55 || 109 || 0.7 || 0.3 || 9 || 6.8 || 15.8 || 2.9 || 5.7
|-style="background-color: #EAEAEA" 
| 2014 ||  || 40 || 21 || 12 || 6 || 180 || 143 || 323 || 77 || 130 || 0.6 || 0.3 || 8.6 || 6.8 || 15.4 || 3.7 || 6.2
|-
| 2015 ||  || 40 || 20 || 10 || 7 || 154 || 166 || 320 || 61 || 122 || 0.5 || 0.4 || 7.7 || 8.3 || 16.0 || 3.1 || 6.1
|-style="background-color: #EAEAEA" 
| 2017 ||  || 40 || 7 || 1 || 2 || 40 || 55 || 95 || 18 || 30 || 0.1 || 0.3 || 5.7 || 7.9 || 13.6 || 2.6 || 4.3
|- class="sortbottom"
! colspan=3| Career
! 124
! 58
! 35
! 1138
! 982
! 2120
! 375
! 758
! 0.5
! 0.3
! 9.2
! 7.9
! 17.1
! 3.0
! 6.1
|}

References

External links

 WAFL Player Profile and Statistics

Essendon Football Club players
Peel Thunder Football Club players
Living people
1988 births
Australian rules footballers from Western Australia
People from Donnybrook, Western Australia
Donnybrook Football Club players
Doping cases in Australian rules football
Bendigo Football Club players